"Blue World" is a song by American musician Mac Miller from his sixth studio album, Circles (2020). It was sent to rhythmic contemporary radio on February 4, 2020, as the second single from the album. The song was written by Miller, Guy Lawrence of Disclosure, George Forrest and Robert Wright, and produced by Lawrence and Jon Brion.

The song was ranked number 71 on The Fader's list of the 100 best songs of 2020. It was also on former President Barack Obama's playlist of his favorite music of 2020.

Composition
Heran Mamo of Billboard called "Blue World" an "electronic-tinged rap" song. The track contains a sample of "It's A Blue World" by American vocal quartet The Four Freshmen, as well as a "syncopated drum pattern and hip-hop rhymes".

Charts

References

2020 singles
2020 songs
Mac Miller songs
Songs written by Mac Miller
Songs written by Guy Lawrence
Songs written by George Forrest (author)
Songs written by Robert Wright (writer)
Song recordings produced by Jon Brion
Warner Records singles